Notoliparis kermadecensis (from Greek: noton, back, and liparos, fat) is a species of snailfish (Liparidae) that lives in the deep sea.

A few species from the Northern Hemisphere have been recorded at similar or deeper depths than N. kermadecensis, including the snailfish Pseudoliparis amblystomopsis from the Kuril–Kamchatka and Japan Trenches. These two species apparently share a common ancestor and occupy similar hadal depth ranges, yet they can only survive at immense pressure and are geographically isolated, and their evolutionary history remains enigmatic.

References
 Notes

 Sources

 

Liparidae
Taxa named by Jørgen G. Nielsen
Fish described in 1964